Pero Family Farms Food Company, formerly Pero Vegetable Company is a Sales, Marketing and Distribution group and a part of an American-based agricultural corporation headquartered in Delray Beach, Florida.

Pero is a large U.S. vegetable grower, packager, marketer and shipper. Pero produces bell peppers (green, red, yellow and orange), specialty peppers (such as chili jalapeño, and Mini Sweet Pepper), cucumbers, squash, zucchini, green beans, eggplant, and pickles.
Pero was founded in 1908 in Western New York by Sicilian immigrant Peter Pero, whose ten-year-old son would bring their crops to the train station by horse-drawn wagon. Over four generations later, the Pero Vegetable Company is still family-owned and family-farmed.

Today the company has farms located in Delray Beach, Florida; Omega, Georgia; Benton Harbor, Michigan; and Tennessee.
Operations include the sales and delivery of bulk commodities, whole freshwrap vegetables and fresh cut packaged retail products.

External links
 Pero Family Farms Website

Food and drink companies based in Florida